The Golden Snowball Award is an annual award presented to the city in Upstate New York that receives the most snowfall in a season. The original award was the result of a friendly competition of National Weather Service offices in Upstate. It was originally conceived after the Great Lakes Blizzard of 1977. After the Rochester and Syracuse offices closed in the mid-1990s, the competition died out.

The award was revived during the 2002–2003 snowfall season when Patrick DeCoursey started up a website to inform people of this fun snow contest from the past.  This was the start of the revival of the snow contest that dated back to the late '70s.  Syracuse won that season and they had won every year from then through the 2010–2011 season as well. In the 2011–2012 season, Rochester was the first city other than Syracuse to win since the award's revival. They also receive temporary possession of a trophy for the year. The original competition's trophy went missing, prompting its replacement with a new one donated by a trophy shop in Syracuse. The current Golden Snowball trophy resides at Buffalo State University.

Compared to Syracuse's average snowfall of 127.8 inches, or over 10 feet per year, New York City's annual snow average is a relatively small 2–3 feet per year in the city and about 3–4 feet per year in nearby suburbs. This is due to a number of factors, including lower latitude and oceanic influence keeping much of the precipitation as rain in the winter, combined with distance from the Great Lakes keeping the city well away from the influence of lake-effect snow.  For the first time ever, during the 2005–2006 winter season New York City did have more snowfall than Albany, mainly due to the Blizzard of 2006, which was the city's biggest snowfall to date, while Albany was on the extreme northern fringe.

The cities that compete for the award are:

 Albany
 Binghamton
 Buffalo
 Rochester
 Syracuse

Until the 2006–2007 season, several smaller cities also competed for a smaller award, that includes a $50 check. These are:

 Fulton
 Oswego
 Utica
 Watertown

Winners of the Golden Snowball 

 2002–2003: Syracuse
 2003–2004: Syracuse
 2004–2005: Syracuse
 2005–2006: Syracuse
 2006–2007: Syracuse
 2007–2008: Syracuse
 2008–2009: Syracuse
 2009–2010: Syracuse
 2010–2011: Syracuse
 2011–2012: Rochester
 2012–2013: Syracuse
 2013–2014: Syracuse
 2014–2015: Syracuse
 2015–2016: Syracuse
 2016–2017: Binghamton
 2017–2018: Syracuse
 2018–2019: Buffalo (Refused Award)
 2019–2020: Rochester
 2020–2021: Binghamton
 2021–2022: Buffalo

Snowfall by season

Note: Official National Weather Service snowfall statistics were not kept at the current locations for Binghamton and Syracuse until the 1951–52 season.

All measurements are in inches.

Snowiest Season for all Golden Snowball Cities: Buffalo 199.4 inches (1976-77)

Least Snowiest Season for all Golden Snowball Cities: Albany 13.8 inches (1912-13)

Max, min and average snowfall by city

Albany
Max: 112.5 inches (1970-71)

Min: 13.8 inches (1912-13)

Average: 59.2 inches

Binghamton
Max: 135.2 inches (2016-17)

Min: 32.0 inches (2015-16)

Average: 86.5 inches

Buffalo
Max: 199.4 inches (1976-77)

Min: 36.7 inches (2011-12)

Average: 95.4 inches

Rochester
Max: 161.7 inches (1959-60)

Min:  41.7 inches (1952-53)

Average: 102.0 inches

Syracuse
Max: 192.1 inches (1992-93)

Min: 50.6 inches (2011-12)

Average: 127.8 inches

References 

Golden Snowball is symbol of upstate winters. So where is it? by Sean Kirst for The Buffalo News; December 15, 2016.

External links
The Golden Snowball Award

Ironic and humorous awards
Snow in the United States
New York (state) culture
Upstate New York
Community awards
American awards